The UCLA Bruins softball program is a college softball team that represents the University of California, Los Angeles in the Pac-12 Conference in the National Collegiate Athletic Association. The team has had 3 head coaches since it started playing organized softball in the 1975 season. The current coach is Kelly Inouye-Perez, who took over the head coaching position in 2007.

UCLA's first coach, Sharron Backus, led the team from 1975–1988 before becoming co-head coach with Sue Enquist.  The two jointly led the team from 1989 through 1996, when Backus retired.  Enquist then served as head coach by herself from 1997 to 2006.

Key

Coaches

Notes

References

Lists of college softball head coaches in the United States

UCLA Bruins softball coaches